Argestru River may refer to:

 Argestru River (Bistrița)
 Argestru River (Bistricioara)

See also 
 Argestru, a village in Vatra Dornei city, Suceava County, Romania